Hanging Curve (1999) is the sixth novel in the Mickey Rawlings baseball mystery series written by Troy Soos. It is set in Saint Louis, Missouri.

Characters 
Major:
 Mickey Rawlings, utility infielder for the St. Louis Browns of the American League
 Marguerite (Margie) Turner, former actress and Mickey's live-in girlfriend
 Karl Landfors, civil rights activist and friend of Mickey's
 Franklin Aubury, black lawyer and associate of Landfors who Mickey meets
 Lee Fohl, manager of the Browns
 Phil Ball, general manager of the Browns
 J.D. Whalen, pitcher/infielder of the Elcars who murdered Crawford by mob
Minor:
 Marty McManus, second baseman for the Browns whom Mickey mentors
 Sherman "Slip" Crawford, pitcher for the St. Louis Stars of the Negro National League, married to wife Hannah
 Melvin "Tater" Greene, former Rawlings teammate who coaxes him to play for a semipro team in an exhibition
 Roy Enoch, owner of Enoch's Elcars and manager of a car dealership
 Brian Padgett, shortstop, Enoch's Elcars
 Denver Jones, infielder, East St. Louis Clubs
 Ed Moss, policeman and manager of Enoch's Elcars
Historical: (partial listing)
 James "Cool Papa" Bell, credited as "Jimmy Bell", mentioned as pitching and fielding for the Stars and Cubs
 Oscar Charleston, player for the Indianapolis ABC's
 Urban Shocker, pitcher for the Browns
 George Sisler, infielder for the Browns
 Branch Rickey, manager of the NL rival Cardinals
 Babe Ruth, outfielder for the New York Yankees, who visits town in 1922
 Ken Williams, outfielder for the Browns
 Baseball Commissioner Judge Kenesaw Mountain Landis

Plot 
Mickey Rawlings has just been traded from the NL Cincinnati Reds to the AL St. Louis Browns, a proverbial team on the rise, but is stuck on the bench. Melvin Greene approaches him to play in an exhibition under an assumed name (Mickey Welch) for Enoch's Elcars, a semipro team from East St. Louis, Illinois. Mickey agrees, but comes to regret it after going 0 for 4 with 3 strikeouts against Slip Crawford, a ringer for the Elcars' opponents, the East Saint Louis Cubs, who win the game 9-5 despite several unsavoury incidents.

As the Browns open a promising season with victory over the Chicago White Sox, East St. Louis marks the passing of Crawford, apparently lynched by a mob of white men after J.D. Whalen, who looked terrible against him in the exhibition, said he heard him insult a white woman. Most of the Elcars and Enoch are members of the Ku Klux Klan. Mickey is recruited by Karl Landfors and Franklin Aubury to investigate the crime.

Rawlings is performing terribly at the plate, is temporarily abandoned by live-in girlfriend Margie Turner after she reveals she had married someone else when she was younger on a dare (and therefore could not marry him), and as worse comes to worst, is suspended for fifteen days after his participation in the semipro game is revealed. But his investigation introduces him to the world of Black America, as revealed in his interactions with Aubury, Bell and other black men. Rawlings' investigations take him to Indianapolis and Evansville, Indiana, even as the Klan try to get him on their side.

Rawlings learns that the reason for Crawford's death leads back to the riots of 1917 in St. Louis.

1999 novels
Baseball novels
Negro league baseball
Ku Klux Klan